Vilakkapetta Bendhangal is a 1969 Indian Malayalam film, directed by M. S. Mani. The film stars Prem Nazir, Sathyan, Ambika and Adoor Bhasi in the lead roles. The film had musical score by A. T. Ummer.

Cast
Prem Nazir
Sathyan
Ambika
Adoor Bhasi
T. R. Omana
K. P. Ummer
Khadeeja
Sadhana
T. K. Balachandran
Ushakumari

Soundtrack
The music was composed by A. T. Ummer and the lyrics were written by Dr. Pavithran.

References

External links
 

1969 films
1960s Malayalam-language films